Albert (short name "Al") Pietersma (September 28, 1935 in Opende, Netherlands) is Dutch professor emeritus of Septuagint and Hellenistic Greek in the Department of Near and Middle East Civilizations at the University of Toronto‘s Faculty of Arts and Science.

Life 
Pietersma born on September 28, 1935 in Opende, of Frisians parents as the second child in a family which included four boys and two girls. At the age of thirteen, Pietersma began studying agricultural education to become a farmer, but his studies were interrupted by emigration to Canada in the spring of 1951. He then helped his parents raise the family near Brockville, Ontario, working in a factory during the day and farming when he returned from work, and in the summers he worked late into the night bringing in hay. In 1956 he started doing high school by correspondence.

In 1960 he married Margaret J. Stadig (native of Amsterdam) and they had three children: Bryan, Kevin and Larisa.

Education 
He studied Calvin College, and when he had not yet graduated, had a conversation with John W. Wevers, who visited the school, and encouraged him to pursue his academic interests. In 1962, he earned a Bachelor of Arts in Classics and Philosophy from Calvin College. In 1965 he earned a Bachelor of Divinity from Calvin Theological Seminary. From 1970 he holds a Ph.D. in Hebrew Language and Literature (Septuagint) from the University of Toronto, under the tutelage of Professor Wevers with the dissertation A Textual-Critical Analysis of Chester Beatty Biblical Papyri IV and V.

Teaching 
From 1969 to 1970 he was a sessional lecturer in the Dept. of Near Eastern Studies at University of Victoria, and from 1970 to 1976 he was associate professor. From 1976 to 1981 he was associate professor at University of Toronto and 1981 to 2001 he became a full professor. Until his retirement in 2001, he was professor emeritus of Septuagint and Hellenistic Greek in the Department of Near and Middle Eastern Civilizations at the University of Toronto.

Affiliations 
From 1972 to 1980, he was secretary and archivist of the International Organization for Septuagint and Cognate Studies, from 1980 to 1987 he was president, and from 1993 honorary president.

Views

Kurios in the LXX 
Pietersma has proposed that the original Septuagint did not contain the tetragrammaton, but that it has been included as a result of a Hebraized recensions, and "he argues that an analysis of the translaton technique used by the LXX traducteurs when they dealt with certain instances of the Hebrew tetragram suggests that they used Kúrios to render it". Sean McDonough and Natalio Fernández Marcos have accepted Pietersma's thesis. On the other hand, Pierre-Maurice Bogaert, Martin Hengel and Emanuel Tov do not accept Pietersma's theory.

Works

Thesis

Books 
 This is a critical edition of the Apocryphon of Jannes and Jambres.

Articles

References 

Living people
1935 births
Academic staff of the University of Toronto
University of Toronto alumni
Old Testament scholars
Translators of the Bible into English
Translators from Greek
Dutch academics
Canadian academics